Tosmare is a district north of Liepāja, Latvia near the Karosta and lake "Tosmare".

Shipyard
Tosmare is well known mostly because of its shipyard "Tosmare", with Tosmare Shipyard currently owned by Rīgas Kuģu Būvētava.  The shipyard was founded in 1900 and has two graving docks.

Notable residents
The Latvian poet Mirdza Ķempe lived here in 1914–1926.

References

Neighbourhoods in Liepāja